Stone is an unincorporated community in Ward Township, Randolph County, in the U.S. state of Indiana.

History
Stone was founded as Stone Station about 1870, when the railroad was extended to that point.

Geography

References

Unincorporated communities in Randolph County, Indiana
Unincorporated communities in Indiana